Cedar Branch is a stream in Gasconade County in the U.S. state of Missouri. It is a tributary of Third Creek.

Cedar Branch (historically called "Cedar Fork") was named for the cedar timber lining its course.

See also
List of rivers of Missouri

References

Rivers of Gasconade County, Missouri
Rivers of Missouri